Firozabad is a city near Agra in Firozabad district in the state of Uttar Pradesh in India. It is the centre of India's glassmaking industry and is known for the quality of the bangles and also glasswares produced there.

During the reign of Akbar, revenue was brought through the city, which was looted by the Afghans. Akbar sent his army led by Firoz Shah Mansab Dar to make the city a cantonment to collect taxes and the city of Chandrawar was renamed as Firozabad after him. The tomb of Firoz Shah is still present today. From early times, it had glass and bangle works, and small scale industry. The landowners of Firozabad hail from the Siddiqui, Sayed, Manihar, Pathan and the Hindu Rajput castes.

The boundaries of Firozabad district touch Etah district in north and Mainpuri and Etawah districts in the east. The Yamuna river makes its southern boundary.

History
The city lies in the cultural region of Braj and was a part of the Surasena Mahajanapada during the Vedic Age. It was subsequently ruled by the bigger kingdoms including the Mauryas, Guptas, Scythians, Kushans, Indo-Greeks, Harsha before falling into the hands of  Brahmin Peshwa ,Rajput rulers.

Before the foundation of modern Firozabad, the main city in the area was at Chandwar, on the left bank of the Yamuna a short distance southwest of Firozabad. Chandwar was a stronghold of the Chauhan Rajputs from an early date, which was founded by a ruler named Chandrasen according to tradition. Chandwar was conquered several times by the Delhi Sultanate, but its Chauhan rulers seem to have repeatedly asserted their independence over a period of several centuries. One tradition holds that the final defeat of the king Jayachandra by Muhammad of Ghor took place here, at the Battle of Chandwar. According to family traditions of the Bhadaurias, another conquest of Chandwar happened in 1246, which may be corroborated by the records kept by the Sultanate, which mention the capture of an unnamed Hindu stronghold in that same year. Then, after the Delhi Sultan Khizr Khan came to power in 1414, his general Taj ul-Mulk received submission from "the infidels of Chandwar" and then, in 1420, he sacked and looted Chandwar as punishment of some sort. In 1452, Chandwar was the site of a major battle between the Delhi and Jaunpur Sultanates, which led to a three-year truce between the two empires.

The modern city of Firozabad was founded c. 1566, when Raja Todar Mal was returning from a pilgrimage to Gaya and stopped at the village of Asafabad (just southeast of modern Firozabad). The villagers insulted him, and when the emperor Akbar heard of this, he sent the eunuch Firoz Khwaja to demolish the town and build a new one. The city was built on lands belonging to several neighboring villages, including Akbarabad, Sukhmalpur, Muhammadpur-Gajmalpur, Rasulpur, and Pempur-Raipur, and it was named Firozabad in honor of its founder. Firoz Khwaja's tomb, built of white marble, is by the road to Agra.

Mr. Peter, a businessman working for the Dutch East India Company visited Firozabad on 9 August 1632, and found the town in good condition. It is written in the gazetteer of Agra and Mathura that in 1596 Faraz was upgraded to a pargana. Faraz was bestowed to Nawab Sadulla Khan as jagir, in the regime of Shahjahan. Jahangir ruled here from 1605 to 1627. Etawah, Budaun, Mainpuri, Faraz were under first class mansabdar of emperor Farrukhsiar. Baji Rao I looted Firozabad and Etmadpur in 1737 in the regime of Mohammad Shah. Jats of Mahawan attacked Faujdar Hakim Kajim ali bahadur jang at Firozabad and killed him on 9 May 1739. Jats ruled Firozabad for 30 years. Gajuddin, Hidayat Vaksh son of Alamgir second his nephew and Mirza baba the son in law, came to Firozabad. Mirza Nabab Khan stayed here until 1782. In the end of the 18th century, Firozabad was ruled by Himmat Bahadur with co-operation of Marathas. The French Army chief of Marathas, D. Wayan, established an ordnance factory in November 1794. Mr. Thomas Traving also mentioned this fact in his book Travels in India. Marathas appointed his subedar Lakwadads here who made a fort near old tehsil, known at present as garie.

General Lek and General Vellajally attacked Firozabad in 1802. In the beginning of British regime Firozabad was in Etawah district but after some time it was attached to Aligarh district. When Sadabad was created as a new district in 1832, Firozabad was attached to it. Later on, in 1833 Firozabad was attached to Agra district. In 1847, the business of lac was flourishing at Firozabad.

In 1857, Zamindar of Firozabad with local public took active parts in freedom struggle. Urdu poet Munir Shikohabadi was sentenced to Kala pani by the British East India Company. People of this city took part in "Khilafat Movement", "Quit India Movement", and "Namak Satyagrah" and went to the jail during these national movements. In 1929, Father of Nation Mahatma Gandhi, in 1935 Khan Abdul Ghaffar Khan, in 1937 Pandit Jawahar Lal Nehru and in 1940 Subhas Chandra Bose visited Pandit Banarasi Das Chaturvedi, a two time member of Parliament - said to be the father of Hindi Journalism and the recipient of Padma Bushan. Firozabad district was finally established on 5 February 1989. In 2015 it became a Nagar Nigam.

Geography

Climate

Demographics

 India census, Firozabad City had a population of 603,797. Males constitute 53% of the population and females 47%. Firozabad has an average literacy rate of 75.01% higher than the national average of 74%: male literacy is 85.32%, and female literacy is 63%. In Firozabad, 16% of the population is under 6 years of age.

The city lies in the cultural region of Braj and the local language is Brajbhasha.

Transport

Firozabad railway station served by the Delhi-Howrah trunk route of the Indian Railways. Several trains serve the city connecting it to long and short distanced destinations including New Delhi, Howrah, Mumbai, Kanpur, Lucknow, Jaipur, Jammu Tawi, Amritsar, Jamshedpur, Patna, Aligarh, Agra, Hathras, Puri, Ajmer, Ambala, Bareilly, Mathura, Etawah, Basti, Gorakhpur and Tundla.

Tundla Junction railway station in the Tundla town (20 km west of Firozabad city on National Highway 2) of the Firozabad District is a major railway station of North Central Railways. Due to its proximity to Agra several trains on the Delhi Howrah route which don't stop at Firozabad station make a stop at Tundla Junction hence serving Firozabad as well as Agra cities. 
 20801/02 Magadh Express 
 14217/18 Unchahar Express
 15483/84 Sikkim Mahananda Express
 12311/12 Kalka Mail
12419/20 Gomti Express
14163/64 Sangam Express
13483/84 Farakka Express
15707/08 Amrapali Express
14723/24 Kalindi Express
12875/76 Neelachal Express
12395/96 Ziyarat Express 
12179/08 Lucknow Intercity Express
19037/38 Bandra Terminus Gorakhpur Avadh Express

Firozabad hence is connected to several bus services to the Western and Eastern parts of Uttar Pradesh state. Due to proximity to Agra and hence the borders of Uttar Pradesh with Rajasthan, Madhya Pradesh states several inter-state bus services also serve the city. Intra-city transport typically consists of Rickshaws and 3-wheelers

The city is well connected with Yamuna Expressway and Taj Expressway to national capital New Delhi and state capital Lucknow respectively.

Water problem
Since few years, Firozabad has been suffering with a severe water pollution problem. The water has been polluted by the indiscriminate discharge of wastes by the industries, causing a literal water "crisis". The water has been tendered practically unusable. Citizens have no option but to install water purifiers at home and use packaged drinking water for consumption.

Tourist attractions

Lord Bahubali Jain Temple 
In Suhag Nagari, holy center of "Jain Nagar" was established by Lt. Seth Chhadamilal. The temple has a 45-foot granite idol of Bahubali, the largest in North India, weighing more than 3500 tonnes. There are many Jain temples near this temple.

References

External links
 Firozabad City E-Portal
 Firozabad District Homepage

 
Industrial cities and towns in Uttar Pradesh
Cities in Uttar Pradesh